Mobilize may refer to:

 Mobilize (company), an American political technology platform
 Mobilize (Anti-Flag album) (2002)
 Mobilize (Grant-Lee Phillips album) (2001)
 Mobilize.org, an American not-for-profit
 Mobilize, a mobility company owned by Renault

See also
 Mobilization (disambiguation)